James Bulkeley may refer to:
 James Bulkeley, 6th Viscount Bulkeley, Welsh landowner and politician
 James Michael Freke Bulkeley, civil servant and political figure in Nova Scotia